Chris Evans is a British journalist who is the editor of The Daily Telegraph. He serves as Director of Content at The Daily Telegraph and previously served as the Executive Head of News at The Daily Telegraph.

Early life 
Evans was born and raised in Walsall, England. He attended King Edward's School in Birmingham before moving to study at the University of Oxford.

Career 
After leaving Oxford University after one year and not graduating, Evans got his first job as a journalist at a news agency - the South West News Service in Bristol.

After 11 years reporting for The Daily Mail, Evans joined The Telegraph as a news editor in January 2007. He 'kept a low profile' while managing to rise to high office. He is said to have a 'solid news background' with populist news instincts. Evans was recruited by The Daily Telegraph's then editor, William Lewis, on strong advice from his deputy, Tony Gallagher.

In 2017, Evans expressed his view that fake news is "great" for the news industry, in the sense that it fostered more trust in traditional news brands by contrast, thus "increasing [their] value."

References 

1968 births
Living people
Writers from Birmingham, West Midlands
The Daily Telegraph people
British male journalists
21st-century English male writers
21st-century British journalists
People educated at King Edward's School, Birmingham
Daily Mail journalists
20th-century English male writers
20th-century British journalists
Alumni of the University of Oxford